POOR Magazine/Prensa Pobre is a grassroots poor people led non-profit arts organization in San Francisco, California and part of the greater indigenous and poor peoples led movements around the world, such as the Landless Peoples Movements, The Homeless Workers' Movement, and Take Back the Land. POOR Magazine additionally holds office in Oakland, CA through its Homefulness Project, a sustainable permanent housing initiative for families displaced by gentrification.

POOR Magazine was founded in 1996 by Lisa “Tiny” Gray-Garcia and Dee Gray, a mother and daughter team struggling with extreme poverty, racism, incarceration, and homelessness in the U.S. In November 2013 POOR Magazine staged a highly publicized action theater piece in front of Twitter Headquarters to protest Twitter's greater financial presence within San Francisco.

POOR Magazine operates low-power FM radio station  KEXU-LP.

References

External links 
 POOR Magazine
 The Homefulness Project

Organizations based in San Francisco
Poverty in the United States